Elections to Weymouth and Portland Borough Council were held on 10 June 2004.  The whole council was up for election with boundary changes since the last election in 2003 increasing the number of seats by 1. The council stayed under no overall control.

Election result

Ward results

References
2004 Weymouth and Portland election result
Ward results 
Golden plan for borough

2004
2004 English local elections
2000s in Dorset